Club Universitario de Pando is a professional football team based in Pando Department, Bolivia that competes in the Bolivian Primera División.

References

Association football clubs established in 1995
Football clubs in Bolivia
1995 establishments in Bolivia